N-acetyltransferase 2 (arylamine N-acetyltransferase), also known as NAT2, is an enzyme which in humans is encoded by the NAT2 gene.

Function 

This gene encodes a type of N-acetyltransferase. The NAT2 isozyme functions to both activate and deactivate arylamine and hydrazine drugs and carcinogens. Polymorphisms in this gene are responsible for the N-acetylation polymorphism in which human populations segregate into rapid, intermediate, and slow acetylator phenotypes. Polymorphisms in NAT2 are also associated with higher incidences of cancer and drug toxicity. A second arylamine N-acetyltransferase gene (NAT1) is located near NAT2.

Phenotype prediction 

The NAT2 acetylator phenotype can be inferred from NAT2 genotype (a combination of SNPs observed in a given individual).

References

Further reading

External links 
 
 
 The Arylamine N-acetyltransferase Gene Nomenclature Committee homepage
 PDBe-KB provides an overview of all the structure information available in the PDB for Human Arylamine N-acetyltransferase 2

Human proteins